The 1933 Turkish Football Championship was the fourth edition of the competition. It was held in October. Fenerbahçe won their first national championship title in their history by defeating İzmirspor 8–0 in the replay of the final match. In the initial final match between Fenerbahçe and İzmirspor the latter were leading 1–0 in the first half. In the second half the referee awarded Fenerbahçe a penalty, which led to persistent protests of İzmirspor players. Eventually, İzmirspor supporters invaded the pitch and the match was aborted. The Turkish Football Federation decided that the replay was to be played on the home ground of the club which would be selected by draw and that a foreign referee would be assigned.

The 1933 final produced the most goals scored in a final during the history of the competition, exceeding the six scored in the 1927 final. The various regional champions competed in a group stage of five groups of three or four teams each, with the group winners qualifying for the final stage.

Group stage

Çukurova Group

Round 1

 Mersin İdman Yurdu received a bye for the group final.

Group final

 Diyarbakır Ayspor won the group and qualified for the final stage.

Western Anatolia Group

Round 1

Group final

 İzmirspor won the group and qualified for the final stage.

Black Sea Group

Round 1

 Trabzon İdman Ocağı received a bye for the group final.

Group final

 Trabzon İdman Ocağı won the group and qualified for the final stage.

Marmara Group

Round 1

Group final

 1 Bursa San'atkâran forfeited. Fenerbahçe were awarded the win and qualified for the final stage.

Central Anatolia Group

Round 1

Group final

 Gençlerbirliği Ankara won the group and qualified for the final stage.

Final stage

Round 1

 Trabzon İdman Ocağı received a bye for the semi-final.

Semi-final

 İzmirspor received a bye for the final.

Final

References

External links
RSSSF

Turkish Football Championship seasons
Turkish
Turkey